ISO 3166-2:RO is the entry for Romania in ISO 3166-2, part of the ISO 3166 standard published by the International Organization for Standardization (ISO), which defines codes for the names of the principal subdivisions (e.g., provinces or states) of all countries coded in ISO 3166-1.

Currently for Romania, ISO 3166-2 codes are defined for 41 departments and 1 municipality. The municipality Bucharest is the capital of the country and has special status equal to the departments.

Each code consists of two parts, separated by a hyphen. The second part is either of the following:
 one letter: municipality
 two letters: departments

The letters are currently used in vehicle registration plates.

Current codes
Subdivision names are listed as in the ISO 3166-2 standard published by the ISO 3166 Maintenance Agency (ISO 3166/MA).

Subdivision names are sorted in Romanian alphabetical order: a, ă, â, b-i, î, j-s, ș, t, ț, u-z.

Click on the button in the header to sort each column.

Changes
The following changes to the entry have been announced in newsletters by the ISO 3166/MA since the first publication of ISO 3166-2 in 1998:

See also
 Subdivisions of Romania
 FIPS region codes of Romania
 NUTS codes of Romania

External links
 ISO Online Browsing Platform: RO
 Counties of Romania, Statoids.com

2:RO
ISO 3166-2
Romania geography-related lists